The Netherlands Rugby League Bond (NRLB) is the governing body for the sport of rugby league football in the Netherlands. Formed in 2009, they obtained observer status with the RLEF (now European Rugby League) in February 2012, and affiliate membership in June 2017.

See also

 Rugby league in the Netherlands
 Netherlands national rugby league team
 Dutch Rugby League Competition

References

External links
 

Rugby league governing bodies in Europe
Rugby league in the Netherlands
Sports governing bodies in the Netherlands
Sports organizations established in 2009